Nepal participated in the 1951 Asian Games held in the city of New Delhi, India from March 4, 1951 to March 11, 1951. Athletes from Nepal failed to secure any medal spot in these Games.

References

Nations at the 1951 Asian Games
1951
Asian Games